GURPS Blood Types is a 128-page soft-bound book compiled by Lane Grate and published in 1995 by Steve Jackson Games as a supplement for the third edition GURPS role-playing game system. It contains biographies and gaming statistics for 23 vampires, vampire-like beings, and guidelines on creating more for various campaign settings.

Contents

The three broad types

GURPS Blood Types breaks vampires and vampire-like beings into three broad types:

Mortal Vampires--Living beings who have become vampires through some pact or deal. Generally they are not undead.

Undead--Once living beings who have come back from the dead to feed on the living

Spirit and otherworldly beings--Otherworldly parasitic beings that masquerade as a member of a mortal race.

Vampire Types
Those with a ^ can be active in daylight

 Adze^, supernatural entity vampire from central Africa mainly Ghana and Togo.
 Alien^, otherworldly vampire—may or may not be supernatural in nature.
 Astral^, mortal vampire (sorcerer) found around the world.  Some examples are Bebarlang of Southeast Asia and Philippines and the Chordewa of Bangal hill tribes.
 Baital^, supernatural entity vampire from India.
 Ch'iang Shich, undead vampire from China.
 Civateteo^, an undead vampire of Mesoamerica.  Another variant of this from the same region is the Langsoir.
 Gaki^, supernatural vampire-like being from Japan—may either be animated corpse or otherworldly spirit
 Ghul^, Mortal vampire (flesh eater) from Arabian folktales
 Gothic, undead vampire made famous by Dracula and most of the movie variants inspired by it
 Half-Vampire^, Mortal vampire that is usually a servant or slave to the Gothic type
 High-Tech^, Mortal vampire created via super science
 Human^, Mortal Vampire who feels the need to drink another's blood
 Incubus (Demon)/Succubus^, supernatural vampire-like entity that drains life via sexual contact rather than blood
 Lamia^, undead/supernatural entity from ancient Greece.
 Lilitu^, supernatural entity vampire from ancient Mesopotamia.  Given their name and nature they may have connection to Adam's first wife (Lilith).
 Loogaroo^, Mortal vampire (soul pact) of Haiti
 Modern, Updated version of Gothic vampire type
 Nosferatu, In the context of GURPS Blood Types it is the vampire seen in the film Nosferatu
 Penanggalen^, Female mortal vampire (soul pact) of Malay Peninsula.  Male counterpart in Berma is the Kephn  Can only feed at night
 Strix, Mortal vampire (witch) of ancient Rome
 Usrel, Undead child vampire of Poland.  If not properly destroyed can rise again as another type.
 Vampir, Traditional undead European vampire of the Slavic nations.  Usually attacks in astral form and is more likely to be a peasant than nobel
 Vyrolakos^, Traditional undead European vampire of the Balkan nations.  Usually attacks physically and in the legend would often take human mates and have families.  Tympanios is a precursor variant that was less insane and did not depend on blood

Publication history
Blood Types is a GURPS game supplement, published as a 128-page softcover book by Steve Jackson Games and designed by Lane Grate. Editing was by Jeff Koke and Scott Haring, with illustrations by Dan Smith and a cover by Tim Bradstreet.

Reception
Rick Swan reviewed GURPS Blood Types for Dragon magazine #227 (March 1996), and rated it a 5 out of 6. According to Swan, Blood Types "belongs on the shelf of every horror aficionado who's had his fill of recycled Bela Lugosis".

Reviews
Rollespilsmagasinet Fønix (Danish) (Issue 12 - Mar/Apr 1996)

Scholarly Bibliography
Among the sources used to make this book are some scholarly ones:
 Barber, Paul (1988) Vampires, Burial and Death (Yale University Press)
 Bunson, Matthew (1993) The Vampire Encyclopedia (Crown Publications)
 Frayling, Christopher (1991) Vampyres: Lord Byron to Count Dracula (Faber and Faber, Ltd)
 Haining, Peter (1977) The Dracula Scrapbook (Bramhall House)
 McNally, Raymond T. and Florescu, Radu (1972) In Search of Dracula (N.Y. Graphic Society)
 Melton, J. Gordon (1994) The Vampire Book (Visible Ink Press)
 Summers, Montague (1928) The Vampire, His Kith and Kin (Routledge and Keegan Paul)
 Summers, Montague (1929) The Vampire in Europe (Routledge and Keegan Paul)
 Twitchell, James B, (1975) The Living Dead: The Vampire in Romantic Literature (Duke University Press)
 Wolf, Leonard (ed.) (1995) The Essential Dracula (Plume)

References

Blood Types
Role-playing game supplements introduced in 1995
Vampires in games